Aurelia Ferrer was an Argentine film actress. She appeared in around forty films, generally in supporting roles.

Partial filmography

 The Newsie and the Lady (1938)
 The Englishman of the Bones (1940)
 Noche de bodas (1942)
 The Kids Grow Up (1942)
 The Third Kiss (1942)
 El tercer beso (1943)
 Dieciséis años (1943)
 Swan Song (1945)
 La señora de Pérez se divorcia (1945)
 Savage Pampas (1945) - Micaela
 Where Words Fail (1946)
 The Three Rats (1946) - Bernarda
 El retrato (1947)
 Con el diablo en el cuerpo (1947)
 María de los Ángeles (1948) - Damiana
 Story of a Bad Woman (1948)
 La calle grita (1948)
 De padre desconocido (1949)
 From Man to Man (1949)
 Esposa último modelo (1950)
 La culpa la tuvo el otro (1950) - Dorotea López
 Cuando besa mi marido (1950)
 Los Isleros (1951)
 Cosas de mujer (1951)
 Los árboles mueren de pie (1951)
 De turno con la muerte (1951)
 The Orchid (1951)
 Black Ermine (1953)
 Las tres claves (1953)
 Desalmados en pena (1954)
 Concierto para una lágrima (1955)
 Bendita seas (1956) - Juanita
 Alejandra (1956)
 Después del silencio (1956)
 Cinco gallinas y el cielo (1957)
 La morocha (1958)
 La hermosa mentira (1958)
 El hombre que hizo el milagro (1958)
 Lindor Covas, el cimarrón (1963) - (final film role)

References

Bibliography
 Jorge Finkielman. The Film Industry in Argentina: An Illustrated Cultural History. McFarland, 2003.

External links

Year of birth unknown
Year of death unknown
Argentine film actresses
20th-century Argentine actresses